Euriphene duseni, or Dusen's nymph, is a butterfly in the family Nymphalidae. It is found in Nigeria and Cameroon. The habitat consists of dense forests.

The larvae feed on Brazzeia species.

Subspecies
Euriphene duseni duseni (southern Cameroon)
Euriphene duseni legeriana Hecq, 1987 (Nigeria, western Cameroon)

References

Butterflies described in 1892
Euriphene
Butterflies of Africa